John Baldwin Sr. was an American figure skater who competed in men's singles.  He finished fourth at the United States Figure Skating Championships in 1972, narrowly missing a chance to compete in the Olympics that year.

Baldwin is the father of skaters John Baldwin Jr., Don Baldwin, and Donna Baldwin.

Results

References 

Living people
American male single skaters
Year of birth missing (living people)